Yingzhou or Ying Prefecture was a zhou (prefecture) in imperial China in modern Hebei, China, seated in modern Hejian. It existed (intermittently) from 487 until 1108.

It was one of the Sixteen Prefectures ceded by Later Jin to the Liao dynasty, however, just 2 decades later it was seized by Later Zhou during the Liao–Later Zhou War.

The modern town Yingzhou, Hebei in Hejian retains its name.

Counties
Ying Prefecture administered the following counties through history:

Two other counties were administered by Ying Prefecture before the Five Dynasties period:
Gaoyang, roughly modern Gaoyang County. In the Song dynasty it was made into a military prefecture called Shun'an Prefecture.
Pingshu, roughly modern Dacheng County. After Later Zhou it was renamed Dacheng and administered by Bà Prefecture.

References

 
 
 

Former prefectures in Hebei
Sixteen Prefectures
Prefectures of the Sui dynasty
Prefectures of the Tang dynasty
Prefectures of Later Tang
Prefectures of the Liao dynasty
Prefectures of Later Zhou
Prefectures of the Song dynasty
487 establishments
1100s disestablishments in Asia
5th-century establishments in China
12th-century disestablishments in China